Holtville may stand for:

 Holtville
 Holtville, Alabama
 Holtville, New Brunswick 
 Holtville Airport